The 2015–16 season was Shirak's 25th consecutive season in the Armenian Premier League and covers the period from 1 July 2015 to 30 June 2016.

Squad

Transfers

In

Out

Released

Competitions

Premier League

Results summary

Results

Table

Armenian Cup

UEFA Europa League

Qualifying rounds

Statistics

Appearances and goals

|-
|colspan="14"|Players who left Shirak during the season:

|}

Goal scorers

Clean sheets

Disciplinary Record

References

Shirak
Shirak SC seasons